Felix Adjei (born 12 December 1990) is a Ghanaian footballer who plays as a left midfielder.

Adjei has previously played for FC Liefering, Red Bull Salzburg and Umeå FC.

References

External links

 

Ghanaian footballers
2. Liga (Austria) players
Austrian Football Bundesliga players
Austrian Regionalliga players
Ettan Fotboll players
FC Red Bull Salzburg players
FC Liefering players
Umeå FC players
SC Wiener Neustadt players
WSG Tirol players
1990 births
Living people
Association football midfielders
Expatriate footballers in Sweden
Expatriate footballers in Austria